Parliamentary elections were held in the United Arab Emirates on 5 October 2019 to elect half of the members (i.e., 20 members) of the Federal National Council. As there were no political parties at the time of the elections, all candidates ran as independents. 

The elections took place through an electoral college, the membership of which was expanded from 224,279 in 2015 to 337,738 in 2019.

Electoral system
The Federal National Council consists of 40 members, 20 of whom are appointed by the rulers of each emirate. and 20 are elected by single non-transferable vote in seven electoral colleges based on the emirates. The colleges of Abu Dhabi and Dubai elects four members each, the colleges of Sharjah and Ras al-Khaimah three each, and the colleges of Ajman, Fujairah and Umm al-Quwain two each. Voters can vote for only one candidate in their emirate. 

In December 2018, President Khalifa bin Zayed Al Nahyan issued a directive that half the members of the Council should be women.

Under the constitution of the United Arab Emirates, "each emirate shall be free to determine the method of selecting the citizens representing it in the Federal National Council". The rulers of each emirate decides who will be able to vote; the total number of voters has increased at each election, with an objective that all citizens will be able to vote in the future.

On election day, 39 voting centers were opened in the UAE, nine of which had been open for early voting on 1–3 October. Overseas voters were able to vote in UAE embassies on 22–23 September.

Campaign
A total of 479 candidates contested the elections.

Results
A total of 117,592 voters were cast, giving a voter turnout of 34.81%. The number of votes cast increased by 48.5% compared to the 2015 elections.

The UAE has a 50% quota system for women in parliament. Therefore 50% of all parliament seats are reserved for women. As a result of the quota system, seven of the 20 elected members were women, although the sole incumbent elected female MP Naama al-Sharhan failed to win re-election in Ras al-Khaimah. To achieve gender parity, 13 of the 20 appointed members were women.

Elected members

References

United Arab Emirates
Parliamentary
Elections in the United Arab Emirates
United Arab Emirates
United Arab Emirates
Election and referendum articles with incomplete results